Madame  is a 2017 French comedy-drama film directed by Amanda Sthers. The film is a satire of the class divide in today's Paris.

Plot

Anne and Bob, an American couple living in Paris, organize a dinner party and invite ten friends. Bob's son with another mother arrives by surprise and the total number of guests is now 13. The superstitious Anne asks her maid, Maria, to pretend to be a rich Spanish friend and join the table. Maria meets David, a well to do Irish art scholar. Bob’s son, who is not a fan of his stepmother Anne, tells David that Maria is actually royalty but will not admit it. They both like each other and start a relationship. When David tells Maria he knows who she really is, she believes he knows she is a maid. Anne is furious when she learns her maid has entered a relationship with David. Anne, who is not ashamed of her own classism, is herself worried that she has outgrown her role as a younger wife and takes the blooming relationship with her friend and maid personally.

Cast
 Harvey Keitel as Bob Fredericks
 Toni Collette as Anne Fredericks
 Rossy de Palma as Maria
 Michael Smiley as David Morgan
 Brendan Patricks as Toby
 Sonia Rolland as Marinette
 Stanislas Merhar as Antoine Bernard
 Sue Cann as Mandy
 Tom Hughes as Steven Fredericks
 Joséphine de La Baume as Fanny
 Ginnie Watson as Jane Millerton
 Tim Fellingham as Michael
 Violaine Gillibert as  Hélène Bernard
 Alex Vizorek as Jacques
 Ariane Seguillon as Josiane
 Salomé Partouche as Gabriella

Production
The film started shooting in Paris on 20 July 2016 for six weeks.

Reception
On review aggregator website Rotten Tomatoes, the film has an approval rating of 44% based on 36 reviews, and an average rating of 5.42/10. The website's critics consensus reads: "Madames retrograde trappings are further weighted down by unlikable characters and an overall inability to do justice to its themes." On Metacritic, the film has a weighted average score of 45 out of 100, based on six critics, indicating "mixed or average reviews".

References

External links
 

2017 comedy-drama films
French comedy-drama films
2010s French-language films
Films about interclass romance
Films set in Paris
2010s English-language films
2017 multilingual films
French multilingual films
2010s French films